Hanis Sagara Putra (born 8 September 1999) is an Indonesian professional footballer who plays as a forward for Liga 1 club Persita Tangerang and the Indonesia national team.

Club career

Bali United
On 4 December 2017, Hanis signed a four-year contract with Bali United. He made his debut on 16 January 2018, against Tampines Rovers in the playoff  AFC Champions League. He signed in during the 84th minute to substitute Irfan Bachdim. And Hanis made his first goal in his debut on added time second half.

PSMS Medan (loan)
He was signed for PSMS Medan to play in Liga 2 in the 2020 season, on loan from Bali United. This season was suspended on 27 March 2020 due to the COVID-19 pandemic. The season was abandoned and was declared void on 20 January 2021.

Persikabo 1973
In 2021, Hanis Sagara signed a contract with Indonesian Liga 1 club Persikabo 1973. He made his professional debut for the club, in a 2–2 draw against Persik Kediri on 17 September 2021, he also scored his first goal for Persikabo, where he scored with a header in the 23rd minutes.

Arema
On 11 April 2022, Sagara is officially introduced as Arema player and signed a year contract. On 7 June 2022, Sagara made his debut and scored his first goal for Arema in a 4–0 friendly match win against RANS Nusantara. On 24 July 2022, he made his league debut in a 0–3 lost against Borneo Samarinda as a substitute in the early minutes of the second half.

Persita Tangerang
Hanis Sagara became Persita Tangerang in half of the 2022–23 Liga 1. Sagara made his debut on 18 January 2023 in a match against Persebaya Surabaya at the Indomilk Arena, Tangerang.

International career
On 31 May 2017, Sagara made his debut against Brazil U20 in the 2017 Toulon Tournament in France. And on June 6, in a match 2017 Toulon Tournament against Scotland U20, Sagara made his first international goal. And Sagara is one of the players that strengthen Indonesia's U19 in the 2018 AFC U-19 Championship.

On 19 October 2021, Sagara made his debut in Indonesia U23 against Tajikistan U23 and he scored a goal to make it 1-1. Sagara made his international debut for the national team on 19 December 2021, in a 2020 AFF Championship game against Malaysia, coming on as a substitute for Kushedya Hari Yudo in the 90+3 minute.

Career statistics

Club

International

International under-23 goals

Honours

Club 
Arema
 Indonesia President's Cup: 2022

International 
Indonesia U-19
 AFF U-19 Youth Championship third place: 2017, 2018
Indonesia
 AFF Championship runner-up: 2020

References

External links
 Hanis Sagara Putra at Soccerway
 Hanis Sagara Putra at Liga Indonesia

1999 births
Living people
Indonesian footballers
People from Bojonegoro Regency
Sportspeople from East Java
Indonesia youth international footballers
Indonesia international footballers
Bali United F.C. players
Persikabo 1973 players
Arema F.C. players
Association football forwards
Liga 1 (Indonesia) players